Siolim Assembly constituency is one of the 40 assembly constituencies of Goa, a southern state of India. Siolim is also one of the 20  constituencies that comes under North Goa (Lok Sabha constituency). It is part of North Goa district.

Members of Legislative Assembly

Election results

2022

2017

2012

See also
 List of constituencies of the Goa Legislative Assembly
 North Goa district

References

External links
  

North Goa district
Assembly constituencies of Goa